Tag Games is a video game developer and publisher based in Dundee, Scotland. Established in 2006, it is focused on creating games for mobile, tablet and wearable platforms and was one of the first European studios to develop titles for both the iPhone and iPad.

Tag is a certified member of the United Kingdom game industry trade association The Independent Games Developers Association (TIGA).

History

Paul Farley, Jamie Bryan and Robert Henning founded Tag Games in 2006. Paul Farley and Jamie Bryan had previously been part of development teams at DMA Design and Vis Entertainment where they worked on titles such as Grand Theft Auto, Space Station Silicon Valley and State of Emergency.

The studio's output consists of a mix of  original IP development and commissioned work. Tag's clients include Rovio , Activision, EA, Ubisoft, Namco Bandai, Channel 4, Big Fish Games and Wooga.

In June 2011, the studio released its first free-to-play mobile game, Funpark Friends. The game was later nominated for IMGA, Bafta and Herald Scotland mobile games awards, winning the Herald Scotland best Scottish Mobile Game 2011. The studio has since gone on to develop a number of free-to-play titles, including Angry Birds Action, Downton Abbey: Mysteries of the Manor and Moshi Monsters Village.

Tag has created titles for the following platforms: Java ME, BREW, Symbian, C++, Android, iOS (iPad, iPhone, iPod), Wii, PSP and Nintendo DS.

Games
In chronological order (not including Live Ops products):

References

External links
 Tag Games Official website

Video game development companies
Mobile game companies
Video game companies of the United Kingdom
Video game companies established in 2006
2006 establishments in Scotland
Companies based in Dundee